The Alan was a German "inflation-period" automobile of simple design; it was manufactured by J Mayer in Bamberg in limited numbers between 1923 and 1925.  The only model, the 6/30, had a 30hp, four-cylinder engine with overhead valves, made in Berlin by Siemens and Halske.

Vintage vehicles
Defunct motor vehicle manufacturers of Germany